Laurentian's Atoll, released on November 19, 2007, is an EP by *shels.

Track listing 
 "Atoll" -  00:21                                          
 "Water (Full Version)" - 06:33
 "The Ghost Writer" - 05:20
 "City Of The Swan" -  07:03
 "Lights In The Laurentian" -  04:48                                          
 "Fireflystarrs" -  07:58
 "Wingsfortheirsmiles" -  04:52
 "m" -  01:59

Info 
This EP features some tracks that were written and recorded in the same session as Sea of the Dying Dhow.
Wingsfortheirsmiles EP (Their first) was hand-made DIY run of 100 copies that sold out.
Demand for that EP meant the release of this, with the same tracks from Wingsfortheirsmiles, along with the extra tracks from Sea of the Dying Dhow.

References

Post-metal EPs
2007 debut EPs
shels albums